Bryan Baker may refer to:
Bryan Baker (baseball) (born 1994), American baseball pitcher
Bryan Baker (fighter) (born 1985), American mixed martial artist
Bryan Baker (racing driver) (born 1961), American NASCAR driver

See also
Brian Baker (disambiguation)